Laura Vetterlein (born 7 April 1992) is a German footballer, who plays as a defender for FC Zürich Frauen in Switzerland. She is the younger sister of Alisa Vetterlein.

Club career
Vetterlein's early interest in football was inspired by her sister Alisa. She joined SV Nollingen's youth system when she was five years old and got a special permit from the German Football Association to keep playing in boys' youth teams until she was 16.

She began her senior career in 2008, electing to join 1. FC Saarbrücken who had just been relegated from the Frauen-Bundesliga and were looking to give younger players a chance in their team. Vetterlein played 48 league matches for Saarbrücken over three seasons and helped them reclaim their place in the top division. But when they were relegated again in 2011 she transferred to Wolfsburg, where her sister was also contracted.

Wolfsburg won the UEFA Women's Champions League in consecutive seasons, but Vetterlein was an unused substitute in both the 2013 and 2014 finals. When her contract was not renewed she agreed a free transfer to SC Sand in May 2015, alongside Wolfsburg teammate Jovana Damnjanović.

In July 2019 Vetterlein signed for FA Women's Super League club West Ham United.

International career
Between April 2007 and February 2012 Vetterlein played 31 matches for Germany's youth international teams, ranging from under-15 to under-20 level.

References

External links

 
 Laura Vetterlein at West Ham United

1992 births
Living people
German women's footballers
German expatriate women's footballers
West Ham United F.C. Women players
Women's association football defenders
Expatriate women's footballers in England
German expatriate sportspeople in England
People from Rheinfelden (Baden)
Sportspeople from Freiburg (region)
SC Sand players
1. FC Saarbrücken (women) players
VfL Wolfsburg (women) players
Frauen-Bundesliga players
Women's Super League players
Footballers from Baden-Württemberg